Cereopsius alboguttatus is a species of beetle in the family Cerambycidae. It was described by C. Waterhouse in 1878. It is known from Borneo.

References

Cereopsius
Beetles described in 1878